TVI Internacional is the international television service of TVI. It is available in Europe, Africa, North America and Oceania. Programming is taken from the main channel as well as TVI 24 and original programming. As a leading channel producing Portuguese telenovelas, TVI started its international expansion as an exclusive to the Angolan ZAP satellite platform on May 30, 2010. In July 2011, it became available as a digital terrestrial television channel in Andorra. In the following year, it became available across cable services in Western Europe and North America.

References

External links
 Official site

Television channels and stations established in 2010
Televisão Independente